Paul Edwin Hasule (20 November 1959 – 26 April 2004) was a Ugandan former footballer. He was captain and coach of the Uganda national football team (known as "The Cranes"). He had been involved in the national team setup as player and coach for 25 years.
Paul Edwin Hasule was born in 1959 to John Haumba Kango and Petwa of Murandu, Mbale. Attracting attention as a striker while at Tororo College and later Makerere University, it was his short career at Mbale Heroes that made him a hot property in Ugandan football.

Joining Villa

The turning point came when he joined SC Villa in November 1981. That came on the back of Heroes relegation from the topflight and made his Villa debut against Nile FC during the Jesse Owens Cup at Nakivubo Stadium in 1981.

The 22-year-old arrived at Villa Park along with top recruits like Cranes skipper Jimmy Kirunda, Dan Lutalo, Godfrey Kisitu and Fred Serwadda. Initially, Villa coach George Mukasa fielded Hasule on the right wing but he was unconvincing and he performed miserably when he was switched to the central striking role.

Stuck between a rock and a hard place, Hasule turned to his natural gifts of power and a towering frame for reprieve and in no time, at the encouragement of Kirunda, forced his way in the defensive positions.

Hasule played a significant part in the title run-in during the 1982 season, scoring a vital goal to seal a 2-1 win over Masaka Union. And he was fast becoming SC Villa’s reliable defender, combining excellent technique and distribution with his appetite for a tackle and a battle. His versatility was also valuable. He ably filled in at the right back and all across the midfield during his time at Villa Park.

After a fantastic 1982 season, in which Villa won the league title unbeaten, national coach Bidandi Ssali put faith in the explosive defender and paired him with Kirunda in most of the Cranes fixtures.

In September 1982, Hasule scored a winner in the 3-2 victory over Tanzania during a Nations Cup qualifier to seal passage to the next round. Like Kirunda, Hasule was a master of the overlap game, which helped him score several goals. One particular match that highlighted Hasule’s overlapping prowess was against Algeria in a 1984 Olympic qualifier.

Not only did he deliver assists for Phillip Omondi and Issa Sekatawa., he scored a brace in the 4-1 first leg win at Nakivubo.

He made a name for himself as a footballer with record local champions SC Villa and became the main factor in their victories between 1982 and 1994. Hasule was part of the mighty SC Villa team that won the inaugural Super League unbeaten in 1982. He also led the club to the prestigious East and Central Africa club title in 1987. Twice he took SC Villa to the finals on the continent, Africa Club Championship in 1991 and CAF Cup in 1992.
Cranes skipper

In 1988, Hasule took over the national team captaincy following Latigo’s departure to Germany. His first assignment came at the 1989 Kuwait Friendship Games in which Iraq edged Uganda in the final through shootouts. However, in what would become the most memorable moment in his career, Hasule scored a wonder opening goal with an unstoppable drive from 30 yards.

A month later, he was on the podium to collect the Cecafa trophy and was at it again in 1990 as Uganda’s regional dominance reached unprecedented heights.  However, things turned bleak in June 1991, when local football body Fufa slapped him a one-year ban after finding him guilty of manhandling referee Fred Wanyama in the league match against UCI. It was lifted after  three months.

Hasule’s response was to be the cornerstone of the Villa side which reached the 1991 final of Africa Club Championships and the 1992 Caf Cup final but on both occasions, the Jogoos finished empty handed.

With his body undergoing physical wear and tear, the now 33-year-old Hasule led SC Villa to the 1992 league title, which proved to be his last silverware as a player.
He had become increasingly hampered by injuries and willfully passed on the mantle to William Nkemba but, like so many great players, Hasule went out on a high note when he quit at the end of 1993 season.

He, however, stayed behind as assistant manager but later moved on to start a coaching career. A sincere and generous man, he died on April 29, 2004 aged just 45. Fittingly fans held prayers for him at Nakivubo Stadium.

A Club and Cranes legend had passed.

He retired as a player in 1993 to become assistant coach and team manager of SC Villa. He left in 1995 to coach State House and later Simba SC but returned in 1998 to SC Villa to win a historic 4th 'Double' (championship and club title). After winning another 'Double' in 2000, Hasule's contract was not renewed in 2001 and he moved on to coach Police FC until his death.

Aged 44, he died in Mulago Hospital in 2004, his death elicited emotional responses from a legion of his followers who paid him their last respects in kind by ensuring a decent burial, pitching in to meet the funeral expenses including the purchasing of a coffin draped in the national flag in his honour.

1959 births
Sportspeople from Kampala
Ugandan footballers
Uganda international footballers
2004 deaths
SC Villa players
Association football forwards